Corby Power Station is a 350 MWe gas-fired power station on Mitchell Road (A6116) in the north-east of Corby in Northamptonshire. It is near (to the west of) the Rockingham racetrack.

History
The station was originally owned by East Midlands Electricity, with smaller shares owned by Hawker Siddeley and ESB International (the Republic of Ireland's national electricity company), under the name Corby Power Ltd. It was constructed by Hawker Siddeley Power Engineering, Ewbank Preece (became part of Mott MacDonald in 1994), and Kier. It opened in February 1994.

In September 2000, East Midlands Electricity (owned by the American Dominion Resources) sold off its 80% stake of the power station to Powergen. ESB owned the other 20%. Powergen became E.ON UK in 2004. In October 2000, the ownership changed to 50% Powergen and 50% ESB International.

ESB acquired in May 2011 EON's share of the station becoming the single owner of the plant.

Operations
The power station is a combined cycle power plant. It has two 119 megawatt (MW) General Electric Frame 9 (9001E) gas turbines produced by EGT. Each has a Babcock Energy heat recovery steam generator. These lead onto one 114 MW steam turbine. The station's generators were built by Brush.

References

External links

 Photo of Corby from Phoenix Parkway

Natural gas-fired power stations in England
Buildings and structures in Northamptonshire
E.ON
Power stations in the East Midlands